DES or Des may refer to:

Computing
 Data Encryption Standard, a block cipher that is no longer secure for today standards
 DirectShow Editing Services, an Application Programming Interface
 Discrete event simulation, a kind of scientific modelling

Education 
 Deccan Education Society, a private education institution based in Pune, India.
 Department of Education and Science (UK), the former name of the Department for Education and Skills
 , a former degree used in France and French-speaking countries

Medical
 Diethylstilbestrol, a synthetic estrogen and the origin of the phrase "DES daughter"
 DES gene, which encodes the desmin protein
 Diffuse esophageal spasm, a disorder of the esophagus
 Dissociative Experiences Scale, a questionnaire to screen for dissociative identity disorder
 Drug-eluting stent, a medical device
 Dry eye syndrome, also known as keratoconjunctivitis sicca
 Dysequilibrium syndrome, a congenital disorder of the nervous system

Other uses
 Dar es Salaam
 Dark Energy Survey, an astronomy project
 Deep Ecliptic Survey, an astronomy project
 Deep eutectic solvent, an ionic solvent
 Defence Equipment and Support, British MOD's defence procurement arm
 Delivered Ex Ship, an international sales term
 Detached eddy simulation, a model in fluid dynamics
 Des, a three-part British series about serial killer Dennis Nilsen
 Desroches Airport, by IATA code
 Arizona Department of Economic Security, a US government organization providing a variety of social support services to Arizona residents
 Desmond (name), a male given name in shortened form
 Desiree (given name), a female given name in shortened form
 Diethyl sulfate, an organic chemical

See also
 Bachelor of Design (B.Des), an academic degree